Jamalabad (also Romanized as Jamālābād) is a village in Jamalabad Rural District, Sharifabad District, Pakdasht County, Tehran Province, Iran. At the 2006 census, its population was 1,717, in 439 families.

References 

Populated places in Pakdasht County

-